The Entrance to Central Miami (also known as Coral Gables Wayside Park) is a historic site in Coral Terrace, Florida, Florida. It is located west of Red Road between Southwest 34th and Southwest 35th Streets. It is operated by the Parks Department of Miami-Dade county. On January 19, 1989, it was added to the U.S. National Register of Historic Places.

References

External links

 Dade County listings at National Register of Historic Places
 Florida's Office of Cultural and Historical Programs
 Dade County listings
 Entrance to Central Miami

Geography of Miami-Dade County, Florida
National Register of Historic Places in Miami-Dade County, Florida